East Bengal Club is an Indian association football club based in Kolkata, West Bengal, which competes in the top tier of Indian football. The club was formed in August 1920 when the Jorabagan Club's vice-president,  Suresh Chandra Chaudhuri, resigned. He did so after the club sent out their starting eleven with the notable exclusion of defender Sailesh Bose, who was dropped from the squad for undisclosed reasons when they were about to face Mohun Bagan in the Coochbehar Cup semi-final on 28 July 1920. He, along with Raja Manmatha Nath Chaudhuri, Ramesh Chandra Sen and Aurobinda Ghosh, formed East Bengal on 1 August 1920. East Bengal started playing in the Calcutta Football League, 2nd division, in 1921. In 1925, they qualified for the first division for the first time and since then they have won many Indian football titles.

East Bengal joined the National Football League (NFL) at its inception in 1996 and is the only club to have played every season to date, including those after the rebranded I-League succeeded the NFL in 2007. East Bengal won the National Football League in 2000–01, 2002–03 and 2003–04 and were runners up seven times, the most by any Indian football club. Among other trophies, East Bengal has won the Calcutta Football League 39 times, the IFA Shield 28 times, the Federation Cup eight times and the Durand Cup 16 times.

There have been thirty-two permanent and nine caretaker coaches of East Bengal since 1920; P. K. Banerjee has managed the club in five different spells, spanning nine seasons, having won thirty-one trophies, the most by anyone in the history of the club.

This chronological list comprises all those who have held the position of coach of the first team of East Bengal since their foundation in 1920. Each coach's entry includes his dates of tenure and the club's overall competitive record (in terms of matches won, drawn and lost), honours won and significant achievements while under his care. Caretaker coaches are included, where known, as well as those who have been in permanent charge.

Coaching history 

From 1920 to 1960, team management and coaching was undertaken by the club's executive committee members and senior players. The subsequent coaching role was known originally as "secretary-coach", as the coach also managed the club's affairs off the pitch as well as on it. Former club secretary Late. J. C. Guha was one of the pioneers of this role as he took over the club in the early 40s and managed the club both on and off the field till he retired in the late 50s and eventually the role of a permanent first team "head coach" was defined and Sushil Bhattacharya was appointed as the first coach by the club in 1961.

1960–1970: Early years 
Sushil Bhattacharya was appointed by the club as the first-ever head coach of the senior men's football team in 1961. In his first and only season in charge, he helped the team win the Calcutta Football League title after a gap of 9 years, the IFA Shield title and also the Dr H. K. Mookherjee Shield. The following year, former club legends Poritosh Chakraborty and Promod Dasgupta took charge of the team jointly and led the team to a Rovers Cup title. In 1963, the East Bengal club appointed Amal Dutta as the head coach of the club for the first time and he served the club for two seasons, although without any major success. In 1966, Mohammed Hussein was appointed as the head coach of the team and he helped the team win back the Calcutta League title once again after 5 years. Hussein remained in charge for 3 seasons (1966–67, 1967–68 and 1970–71) and helped the club win 7 major titles including two Calcutta League titles, two Durand Cup titles, two IFA Shield titles and one Rovers Cup title.

1970–1995: Dominance and road to professionalism 
Swaraj Ghosh was appointed the coach of the club in 1971 and he led the club to another Calcutta League title. In 1972, the East Bengal club appointed former India national team captain P. K. Banerjee as the head coach of the club and the most dominating era of the club began. In 1972, his first season in charge, P. K. Banerjee led the East Bengal club to become champions in all five tournaments his team participated in, remaining unbeaten throughout the season and conceding just two goals in 42 matches. East Bengal club became the first-ever Indian club to win the coveted Triple-crown of Indian football: The IFA Shield, the Durand Cup and the Rovers Cup in the same season. The following season, the undefeated streak extended to 57 matches, before tasting defeat for the first time against Khidderpore in the Calcutta League. The club won five more titles in 1973 including two famous victories over North Korean football teams, first defeating Pyongyang City in the IFA Shield final and then defeating Dok Ro Gang in the DCM Trophy final, a team which consisted of players from the 1966 FIFA World Cup North Korean squad. In 1975, P. K. Banerjee led East Bengal to achieve history, as they first won the Calcutta Football League title for the sixth consecutive time winning all the matches, overtaking the record of five titles set my Mohammedan Sporting from 1934 to 1938, and then a fourth consecutive IFA Shield title defeating arch-rivals Mohun Bagan in the final by 5–0, the highest margin till date in a Kolkata Derby game. P. K. Banerjee led the East Bengal club to sixteen major trophies in four seasons which included four Calcutta League titles, four IFA Shield titles, three Rovers Cup titles, two DCM trophies, two Bordoloi Trophy wins and one Durand Cup title. 

After P. K. Banerjee left after 1975, Amal Dutta was once again appointed as the head coach of the club for his second stint after 1964. Dutta led East Bengal to three titles in two seasons, including a famous all win Calcutta league title in 1977. Former India and club legend Arun Ghosh was appointed as the coach in 1978 and he led the club to their first-ever Federation Cup title in the club's very first appearance in the tournament, jointly shared with Mohun Bagan. After a disappointing 1979 season, Arun Ghosh was replaced by P. K. Banerjee once again for his second stint with the club and he led the team to their second Federation Cup triumph, again jointly shared with Mohun Bagan, the Darjeeling Gold Cup and a Rovers Cup title, jointly shared with Mohammedan Sporting. P. K. Banerjee had three more stints with the club, first in 1983–84, then again in 1985–86 where he led the club to their third Federation Cup title defeating Mohun Bagan 1–0 in the final and then again from 1988 to 1990 winning five more trophies for the club. In 1985, after winning the Federation Cup title, P. K. Banerjee led the East Bengal club to their first-ever international triumph as the club won the Coca-Cola Cup, the Central-Asia zonal tournament, held as a preliminary tournament for the 1985-86 Asian Club Championship. In total, P. K. Banerjee won thirty-one titles as the head coach of East Bengal, a record still unmatched to date. 

In 1990, the club appointed another former India and club legend Syed Nayeemuddin as the head coach and in his first season, he led East Bengal club to their second Triple-crown of Indian football. Nayeemuddin led East Bengal to six trophies in two seasons in his first stint with the club. He was again appointed as the head coach in 1994 when he again led the team to seven trophies in two seasons. He had one more stint as the head coach in 2000 and holds the record of winning eighteen trophies as the head coach of the club, only second to P. K. Banerjee.

1996–2020: National League and I-League era 
The National Football League was launched in 1996, the first nationwide top division league in India and East Bengal club appointed club legend Monoranjan Bhattacharya as the head coach and P. K. Banerjee as the Technical Director of the team. P. K. Banerjee discontinued after a year, but Monoranjan Bhattacharya remained in charge for three seasons, winning seven trophies including a Federation Cup triumph against Dempo in 1996. Monoranjan Bhattacharya was once again brought back in 2000–01 after Syed Nayeemuddin left charge just before the National League and Bhattacharya led the club to their maiden National Football League triumph in 2000–01. Monoranjan Bhattacharya continued until the mid-way of the 2002–03 season, before resigning over poor results. He won a total of ten trophies as the head coach of East Bengal.

After Monoranjan Bhattacharya stepped down, another club legend Subhash Bhowmick was appointed as the head coach of the club. This was Bhowmick's second stint with the club after 1999–00. Bhowmick took charge of the team and won back to back National Football League titles in 2002–03 and 2003–04. In 2002–03 season, Bhowmick led East Bengal to all five trophies the club participated in, the feat East Bengal club achieved back in 1972–73. The following season, Bhowmick made history as he led the East Bengal club to the 2003 ASEAN Club Championship title in Jakarta, defeating BEC Tero Sasana in the final. Bhowmick won a total of twelve trophies as the head coach of the club, only third behind P. K. Banerjee and Syed Nayeemuddin.

In 2005, Bhowmick stepped down from his position due to legal issues, and the club appointed Philippe De Ridder, the first-ever foreign national to be the head coach of East Bengal. Ridder led East Bengal to the 2006 Super Cup title after finishing runners-up in the 2005–06 National Football League. Brazilian veteran coach Carlos Roberto Pereira was appointed in charge in 2006–07 season winning just the Calcutta Football League. Between 2007 and 2010, the club changed the head coach seven times with the likes of Subrata Bhattacharya, Monoranjan Bhattacharya, Aloke Mukherjee, Stanley Rozario, Subhash Bhowmick and Philippe De Ridder taking charge. Subrata Bhattacharya led East Bengal to their fifth Federation Cup triumph in 2007 after eleven years, while Ridder led the club to their sixth Federation Cup title in 2009–10.

In 2010, English coach Trevor James Morgan was appointed as the head coach of the club. Morgan led East Bengal to eight trophies in his three-season in charge, which included three Calcutta League titles, two Federation Cup titles (2010 and 2012), one IFA Shield, one Super Cup and one Platinum Jubilee Cup title. He was once again appointed as the coach in 2016, and in his two spells with the club, he was won a total of nine trophies, the most by any foreign coach for the club. 

The club also appointed the likes of Marcos Falopa, Armando Colaco, Eelco Schattorie, Biswajit Bhattacharya, Khalid Jamil, Alejandro Menéndez and Mario Rivera Campesino after Morgan left in 2013.

2020–present: Indian Super League era 

In 2020, East Bengal club jumped from the I-League to the Indian Super League, and appointed Liverpool legend Robbie Fowler as the head coach of the club. Fowler took charge of the team in the 2020–21 season and finished ninth in the Indian Super League campaign. The club and Robbie Fowler mutually terminated the contract in 2021, and former Real Madrid Castilla coach Manolo Díaz was appointed in charge for the 2021–22 season. However, Diaz lasted just eight matches failing to win even one game and the club mutually terminated his contract on 28 December 2021 and assistant coach and former player Renedy Singh was appointed as the interim head coach of the team. On 1 January 2022, East Bengal announced that former Spanish head coach Mario Rivera Campesino, who was in-charge of the team in the 2019–20 season, has been re-appointed as the head coach of the team for the remaining of the season, thus becoming the third foreign national to be appointed as the head coach of East Bengal twice after Philippe de Ridder and Trevor James Morgan.

On 27 July 2022, East Bengal club and Emami Group, the new investor group of the club, announced the appointment of former India national football team manager Stephen Constantine as the new head coach of the club for the 2022–23 season.

East Bengal coaches
Key
  Coaches with this background and symbol in the "Name" column are italicised to denote caretaker appointments.
  Coaches with this background and symbol in the "Name" column are italicised to denote caretaker appointments promoted to full-time coach.

Statistics
East Bengal club in its history of more than a hundred years has had a number of coaches who won quite a few honours for the club. The legendary P.K. Banerjee in his nine-season spell with the club has won a total of thirty-one trophies, including five trophies in a season twice in 1972–73 and 1973–74, which is the highest for any coach in the club's history. The Dronacharya award winner Syed Nayeemuddin comes second in the most honours list with a total of sixteen titles to his name as the coach of Red and Gold brigade including another "Triple Crown" in 1990–91. Former player and coach Subhash Bhowmick too brought in huge success in the current millennia with twelve titles on his regime including five trophies in a season again in 2002–03, winning back to back National League titles and the famous 2003 ASEAN Club Championship in Jakarta. Amal Dutta, regarded as the very first professional coach in Indian football too won eleven titles during his five different spells at the club. Club legend Monoranjan Bhattacharyais fifth on the list with ten trophies as the head coach, including the very first National League title in 2000–01. Among foreign coaches, Englishman Trevor James Morgan has won the most titles for the club, with nine titles to his name in two spells at the club.

Record for East Bengal coaches
Record in competitive matches for East Bengal coaches since the beginning of National Football League in India from the 1996–1997 season.

Most successful East Bengal coaches
Below is the list of the 5 most successful East Bengal head-coaches as per most honours won:

Most trophies won in a single stint

List of technical directors for East Bengal
East Bengal Club has appointed a technical director at times to over-head the head-coaches. The very first Technical Director was the legendary P.K. Banerjee who was appointed in 1996–97 season over head-coach Monoranjan Bhattacharya. Later Monoranjan Bhattacharya himself and Subhash Bhowmick too were appointed as the Technical Directors of the team in separate occasions.

Foreign coaches for East Bengal
East Bengal appointed their very first foreign coach in 2005 when they signed Belgian head coach Philippe De Ridder. The club has since appointed ten foreign coaches, the latest being former India national football team coach Stephen Constantine in 2022. English coach Trevor James Morgan is the most successful foreign coach at the club with 130 wins from 206 matches, emassing a 63.1% win-ratio in all competitions during his four-year stay in two spells at the club. Philippe De Ridder,  Trevor James Morgan and Mario Rivera Campesino are the only three foreign coaches to be appointed more than once by the club.

Record for foreign coaches
Record in competitive matches for foreign coaches.

Foreign support staff for East Bengal

In 2003–04 season, East Bengal brought in South African Kevin Jackson as the physical trainer for the team ahead of participating in the 2003 ASEAN Club Championship. He was the first foreign physical trainer that the club has ever hired. The club had appointed many foreign physical trainers since then. In 2015–16, East Bengal appointed their former defender Kenyan Sammy Omollo as the assistant coach of the team, the first foreign personnel to take charge of that role.

Accolades

I-League Coach of the Month
In the 2019–20 I-League season, the AIFF had introduced the I-League Coach of the Month award, given to the best Coach of an I-League side for the month. The first award was awarded to East Bengal coach Alejandro Menendez for the month of December – 2019, as he managed to stay undefeated for the month with 2 wins and 2 draws.

References

External links

 
East Bengal